Corey Washington (born December 29, 1991) is a former American football player. He played college football at Newberry College and was signed by the Arizona Cardinals as an undrafted free agent in 2014.

College career
Washington played college football at Georgia Military College for his freshman and sophomore seasons and at Newberry College his junior and senior seasons. During his college career, he had 146 receptions for 2,396 yards and 34 touchdowns.

Professional career

Arizona Cardinals
Washington signed with the Arizona Cardinals as an undrafted free agent on May 12, 2014 and was waived on May 27.

New York Giants
Washington was claimed off waivers by the New York Giants on May 29, 2014. During training camp he impressed the Giants coaches and was considered likely to make the teams 53-man roster. Washington made the 53-man roster after finishing preseason as the Giants leading receiver. He caught his first regular season touchdown of his career on November 3, 2014 against the Indianapolis Colts. Washington was waived/injured by the Giants on September 5, 2015. He was released by the team with an injury settlement the following day.

Washington Redskins
On October 26, 2015, Washington signed to the practice squad of Washington Redskins. He was released by the team on November 9.

Detroit Lions
On November 18, 2015, Washington was signed to the Lions' practice squad. On January 4, 2016, Washington signed a futures contract with the Detroit Lions. He was waived by the Lions in June 2016 and returned to the reserve list after clearing waivers.

Atlanta Falcons
On July 27, 2016, Washington was signed by the Falcons. On September 3, 2016, he was waived by the Falcons due to final roster cuts.

Buffalo Bills
On October 4, 2016, Washington was signed to the Bills' practice squad. He was released by the Bills on October 25, 2016.

On March 17, 2017, Washington re-signed with the Bills. On May 11, 2017, he was waived by the Bills.

Kansas City Chiefs
On July 31, 2017, Washington signed with the Kansas City Chiefs. He was waived on August 8, 2017.

Dallas Cowboys
On August 15, 2017, Washington signed with the Dallas Cowboys. He was waived/injured on August 25, 2017 and placed on injured reserve. He was released on August 27, 2017.

References

External links
New York Giants bio

1991 births
Living people
People from North Charleston, South Carolina
Players of American football from South Carolina
American football wide receivers
Newberry Wolves football players
Arizona Cardinals players
New York Giants players
Washington Redskins players
Detroit Lions players
Buffalo Bills players
Kansas City Chiefs players
Dallas Cowboys players